The Rotokino River is a short river of the West Coast Region of New Zealand's South Island. It flows south from Lake Rotokino, draining its waters to the Whataroa River.

See also
List of rivers of New Zealand

References

Rivers of the West Coast, New Zealand
Rivers of New Zealand
Westland District